Kalpatti Island is an uninhabited island of Agatti atoll in Lakshadweep, India. There were plans to extend the runway of the airport on the nearby Agatti Island to Kalpati Island to accommodate jet aircraft. The plans were rejected on environmental grounds because the proposed runway extension would have passed a turtle colony.

Administration
The island belongs to the township of Agatti Island of Kavaratti Tehsil.

Image gallery

See also 

 Agatti Aerodrome

References 

Islands of Lakshadweep
Uninhabited islands of India
Islands of India